North Branch Little Black Creek drains North Branch Lake and flows west passing to the south of Forty Mountain before flowing into Little Black Creek in Wheelertown, New York.

References 

Rivers of New York (state)
Rivers of Herkimer County, New York